TT-Line GmbH is a shipping company based in Lübeck, Germany, which has been providing ferry service between Travemünde in Schleswig-Holstein and Trelleborg in southern Sweden since 1962. Since 1992, it has also operated a service from Rostock to Trelleborg (until 1997 marketed as TR-Line) and from Swinoujscie in Poland. As of 2007, TT-Line possesses six ferries.

In 1978, TT-Line acquired 50% of Olau Line and purchased the rest of the company in 1979. TT-Line remained the sole owner of Olau Line until the line's closure in 1994.

Routes
TT-Line offers the following routes:
 Klaipėda - Trelleborg
 Travemünde - Trelleborg
 Rostock - Trelleborg
 Świnoujście - Trelleborg
 Travemünde - Helsingborg (Freight only)

Ferries

Present 
TT-Line operates the following ferries:
 M/S Robin Hood (Ex Nils Dacke) (1995-)
 M/S Nils Dacke (Ex Robin Hood) (1995-)
 M/S Akka (Ex Nils Holgersson (6)) (2001-)
 M/S Tinker Bell (Ex Peter Pan) (2001-)
 M/S Tom Sawyer (Ex Nils Holgersson) (2001-)
 M/S Huckleberry Finn (Ex Peter Pan) (2002-)
 M/S Nils Holgersson (7) (2022-)
 M/S Peter Pan (2023-)

Past
These vessels have sailed for TT-Line:
 M/S Nils Holgersson (1) (1962-1967)
 M/S Peter Pan (1) (1965-1973)
 M/S Calmar Nyckel (1965, Chartered)
 M/S Visby (1966, Chartered)
 M/S Finndana (1966, Chartered)
 M/S Gösta Berling (Ex Nils Holgersson (1)) (1966-1967,1973-1975)
 M/S Nils Holgersson (2) (1967-1975)
 M/S Escapade (1967-1973, Chartered)
 M/S Sardaigne (1969, Chartered)
 M/S Viking I (1973-1974, Chartered)
 M/S Gotland (1974, Chartered)
 M/S Peter Pan (1974-1986)
 M/S Nils Holgersson (3) (1975-1984)
 M/S Oliver Twist (Ex Nils Holgersson (3)) (1975-1978)
 M/S Mary Poppins (Ex Gösta Berling) (1975-1976)
 M/S Robin Hood (1)(1977,1978,1979, Chartered)
  (1977, chartered) 
 M/S Espresso Olbia (1980, Chartered)
 M/S Saga Wind (1981-1989)
 M/S Norröna (1984-1985, 1986. Chartered)
 M/S Stena Transporter (1984, Chartered)
 M/S Nordic Sun (1985-1986, Chartered)
 M/S Robin Hood (2) (1986-1987)
 M/S Saga Moon (1986, Chartered)
 M/S Peter Pan (3) (1986-1993)
 M/S Saga Star (1986-1988, 1993-2002, Chartered)
 M/S Nils Holgersson (4) (1987-1993)
 M/S Finnfellow (1988, Chartered)
 M/S Nils Dacke (1) (1988-1993)
 M/S Robin Hood(3) (1989-1992)
 M/S Fedra (1992-1993, Chartered)
 M/S TT-Traveller (1992-1995, 1997-2002, Chartered)
 M/S Diana II (1992-1994, chartered)
 M/S Nils Holgersson (1993)|M/S Nils Holgersson (5) (Ex Robin Hood (3)) (1993-2001)
 M/S Peter Pan (1993)|M/S Peter Pan (4) (Ex Nils dacke (1))  (1993-2001)
 M/S Via Ionio (1993, Chartered)
 M/S Aries (1994, Chartered)
 M/S Saga Aris (1994-1995)
 M/S Nord Neptunus (1994, Chartered)
 M/S Villars (1995, Chartered)
 M/S Gleichberg (1995-1996, Chartered)
 HSC Delphin (1996-2002)
 HSC TT-Delphin (Ex Delphin) (2002-2005)
 M/S Svealand (2006, Chartered)
 M/S Götaland (2010, Chartred)

Notes

References

External links 

 TT-Line

Companies based in Schleswig-Holstein
Ferry companies of Germany
Ferry companies of Sweden
Port of Lübeck
Shipping companies of Germany
Transport in Lübeck